Masked Singer Sverige is the first season of Swedish Masked Singer started on 26 March 2021 on TV4 and ended on 21 May 2021. The presenter is David Hellenius while the panel consists of Nour El Refai, Felix Herngren, Pernilla Wahlgren and Måns Zelmerlöw, who every week will get to guess who the secret celebrity singer is.

Contestants

Episodes

Week 1 (26 March)

Week 2 (2 April)

Week 3 (9 April)

Week 4 (16 April)

Week 5 (23 April)

Week 6 (30 April)

Week 7 (7 May)

Week 8 (14 May) 
 Group number: "Wannabe" by Spice Girls (Enhörningen), "Who Let the Dogs Out" by Baha Men (Sjöbjörnen), "Good Vibrations" by Marky Mark and the Funky Bunch (Draken), "Gangnam Style" by PSY (Voodoodockan), "Hey Baby (Drop It to the Floor)" by Pitbull (Godisautomaten), "Party Rock Anthem" by LMFAO ft. Laura Bennett & GoonRock (Final 5 and Myskoxen)

Week 9 (21 May) - Final 
 Group number: "Faith" by Stevie Wonder ft. Ariana Grande

References

External links 
 

2021 Swedish television seasons
Masked Singer
TV4 (Sweden) original programming